Goal! Two is a soccer (football) video game developed by Tose for the Nintendo Entertainment System (NES), and published by Jaleco in 1992. Goal! Two is Tose's first sequel to the NES title  Goal! (released in Japan as Moero !! Pro Soccer). On 04/24/92, Tose's first soccer title for the Super Famicom,  was published by Jaleco.  It was later ported to the Famicom on 09/25/92 as Goal!!. Jaleco localized the Famicom game for the NES as Goal! Two for North American markets, and Goal! 2 for European markets later that year. Finally, the Super Famicom version was brought to the Super NES (SNES) as Goal! for North America and Super Goal! for Europe in December 1992, shortly after Goal Two! for the NES. The cover model is John Brady, an amateur soccer player from London who was living in Chicago.

For the French release of the NES version, Jaleco secured an endorsement from French international footballer Eric Cantona, who had just transferred to Manchester United F.C. The French packaging bears the name and likeness of Cantona, with the prefixed title Eric Cantona Football Challenge: Goal! 2. The SNES title Eric Cantona Football Challenge, however, is an internationalization of Striker (Rage Software 1992).

Goal! for NES is a localization of Moero!! Pro Soccer (1988), the fifth installment in the long-running Moero!! sports game series. The Goal! video game series is a spin-off of the Japanese Moero!! series.

Jaleco followed [Super] Goal! with Super Goal! 2 (1994), a localization of Takeda Nobuhiro no Super Cup Soccer (1993). An additional Super Famicom installment, Takeda Nobuhiro no Super League Soccer (1994) was published only in Japan.

Gameplay
Players choose a national men's team from a list of 25 countries (a net increase of eight compared with Goal! for NES). Like Goal! for NES, Goal! Two is not endorsed by any football team or federation, so kit colors are inauthentic.

In addition to a "Super Cup" tournament mode, the game allows for exhibition matches for a single-player, or for two players playing either competitively or cooperatively. However, whereas Goal! for NES has a shoot-out mode, Goal! Two and [Super] Goal! do not.

In this sequel, Tose made several presentational changes: They adjusted the perspective of the football pitch; increased the size of the football player sprites and goals; enlivened the interstitial animation; and improved the game music and sound effects.

Among the functional changes to the game are a choice of team formations and the ability to choose the team's 11 members from a roster of 15.

See also
Internationalization and localization
List of Nintendo Entertainment System games
List of Super Nintendo Entertainment System games

References

External links

1992 video games
Association football video games
Jaleco games
Nintendo Entertainment System games
Super Nintendo Entertainment System games
Tose (company) games
Video games developed in Japan
Video games scored by Takeshi Ichida
Video games with isometric graphics
Multiplayer and single-player video games